Percy Alec Deift (born September 10, 1945) is a mathematician known for his work on spectral theory, integrable systems, random matrix theory and Riemann–Hilbert problems.

Life
Deift was born in Durban, South Africa, where he obtained degrees in chemical engineering, physics, and mathematics, and received a Ph.D. in mathematical physics from Princeton University in 1977. He is a Silver Professor at the Courant Institute of Mathematical Sciences, New York University.

Honors and awards
Deift is a fellow of the American Mathematical Society (elected 2012), a member of the American Academy of Arts and Sciences (elected 2003), and of the U.S. National Academy of Sciences (elected 2009).

He is a co-winner of the 1998 Pólya Prize,
and was named a Guggenheim Fellow in 1999. He gave an invited address at the International Congress of Mathematicians in Berlin in 1998 and plenary addresses in 2006 at the International Congress of Mathematicians in Madrid and at the International Congress on Mathematical Physics in Rio de Janeiro. Deift gave the Gibbs Lecture at the Joint Meeting of the American Mathematical Society in 2009.  Along with Michael Aizenman and Giovanni Gallavotti, he won the Henri Poincare Prize in 2018.

Selected works
 with Eugene Trubowitz: Inverse scattering on the line, Communications in pure and applied Mathematics, vol. 32, 1979, pp. 121–251 
 with Fernando Lund, E. Trubowitz: 
 with Richard Beals, Carlos Tomei: Direct and inverse scattering on the line, AMS, 1988
 with Luen-Chau Li, C. Tomei: Loop groups, discrete versions of some classical integrable systems, and rank 2 extensions, AMS, 1992
 with K. T-R McLaughlin: A continuum limit of the Toda lattice, AMS, 1998
 Orthogonal polynomials and random matrices: a Riemann-Hilbert approach, AMS (American Mathematical Society), 2000 (and Courant Institute, 1999)
 with Dmitri Gioev: Random matrix theory: invariant embeddings and universality, AMS, 2009
 with Jinho Baik  and Toufic Suidan

See also
Riemann–Hilbert problems
random matrix theory
integrable systems

References

External links
Percy Deift personal webpage, Courant Institute, New York University
Percy Alec Deift, Mathematics Genealogy Project

1945 births
20th-century American mathematicians
21st-century American mathematicians
South African mathematicians
Members of the United States National Academy of Sciences
Princeton University alumni
Courant Institute of Mathematical Sciences faculty
Living people
Fellows of the American Mathematical Society